Exoprosopa caliptera is a species of bee flies in the family Bombyliidae. Its range is noted as being in British Columbia, Canada, as well as throughout the Western United States, Arkansas, and South Dakota. It is also found in the Mexican state of Durango.

References

External links

 

Bombyliidae
Articles created by Qbugbot
Insects described in 1823